Located in Middle Egypt, the Tombs of the Nobles at Amarna are the burial places of some of the powerful courtiers and persons of the city of Akhetaten.

The tombs are in two groups, cut into the cliffs and bluffs in the east of the dry bay of Akhetaten. There are 25 major tombs, many of them decorated and with their owners name, some are small and unfinished, others modest and unassuming. Each seems to reflect the personality and patronage of the tomb's original owner.

Northern tombs

These tombs are located in two groups in the cliffs overlooking the city of Akhetaten, to the north and east of the city. They are split into two groups by a wadi, and are near one of the Boundary Stelae (Stela V).

Desert altars
At a short distance to the west and north of the Northern Tombs lie the remains of three large mud-brick solar altars in the form of platforms with ramps. The reason for their location is not clear. Their connection with an ancient road leading to the Northern Tombs would seem to be a sign that they were for the benefit of those buried in them.

Southern tombs
The southern tombs are located in a series of low bluffs south and east of the main city. Associated with these tombs a recently discovered  workers cemetery has been found.

Rediscovery and excavation
Some the tombs have obviously been open since antiquity, and have been used variously as burial places in the Ptolemaic times, storehouses, houses and as Coptic churches.

See also
 Anonymous Tombs in Amarna

Notes and references

References

Further reading
 N. de G. Davis – The Rock Cut Tombs of El Amarna. Society for the Study of Egyptian Antiquities, 2004. Facsimils in Internet Archive: Part I. The Tomb of Meryre, 1903; Part II. The Tombs of Panehesy and Meryra II, 1905; Part III. The Tombs of Huya and Ahmes, 1905; Part IV. The Tombs of Penthu, Mahu and Others, 1906; Part V. Smaller Tombs and Boundary Stelae, 1908 y Part VI. Tombs of Parennefer, Tutu and Ay, 1908.
 Owen, Gwil – The Amarna courtiers' tombs. Egyptian Archaeology Autumn 2000

External links

 City of Amarna, including all Tombs
 Northern tomb no. 1 of Huya
 Northern tomb no. 3 of Ahmes/Ahmose
 Northern tomb no. 4 of Meryra/Meryre I
 Northern tomb no. 6 of Panhesy

Amarna tombs